The New Democrats are a minor party founded in 2022 by then-sitting MLC and former Victorian Labor Party member Kaushaliya Vaghela. A former Independent MLC for the Western Metropolitan Region, Vaghela is the party's secretary. The party is also claimed to have over 2,000 members, being registered by the Victorian Electoral Commission (VEC) on 6 October 2022,  before the state election.

References
 

 

 
New Democrats
Political parties established in 2022  
2022 establishments in Australia